A moral imperative is a strongly-felt principle that compels that person to act. It is a kind of categorical imperative, as defined by Immanuel Kant.  Kant took the imperative to be a dictate of pure reason, in its practical aspect. Not following the moral law was seen to be self-defeating and thus contrary to reason.  Later thinkers took the imperative to originate in conscience, as the divine voice speaking through the human spirit.  The dictates of conscience are simply right and often resist further justification.  Looked at another way, the experience of conscience is the basic experience of encountering the right.

An example of not following a moral imperative is making a promise that you do not intend to keep in order to get something.

Global Economic Moral imperative 

Toby Ord Explores a moral imperative driven by a utilitarian view in relation to  economics and global health. A hypothetical example he gives is that a group has $40,000 to spend on blindness. The money could be spent to provide one U.S. person with a seeing eye dog and training or could be used to reverse the effects of 2,000 cases of trachoma in Africa through surgery. The utilitarian answer would be to help more people.

Toby also provides some real-world examples. Some real-world examples provide data on the cost to prevent or treat AIDS. Analyzing the cost-effectiveness of these methods of treatment and prevention is a moral imperative because the most effective use of funds can save more lives.

Gary Locke and Angel Gurria stated cases for economic moral imperatives related to corruption and anti-bribery laws. Water provides 40 percent of the world's food requirement and in developing countries there can be a 30 percent premium on water.   Thomas Pogge argues that this corruption is strongly encouraged by the existing international rules as the rulers of these countries have much to gain from these larger countries and corporations.

See also

 Deontological ethics
 Teleology
 Ethical dilemma

References

Concepts in ethics
Intention
Imperative